The Holy Trinity Greek Orthodox Church is a Greek Orthodox church in Tulsa, Oklahoma. It was incorporated May 20, 1925 to serve immigrants from Greece who adhered to the Greek Orthodox faith. After holding a fund drive to raise money for construction of a church, the founding members bought three city lots at Eleventh Street and South Guthrie Avenue in Tulsa, where they built their first sanctuary. The groundbreaking was held in May, 1927, and the first service occurred in March, 1928.

The congregation began hosting an annual Greek Festival to celebrate its ancestral culture.

In 1968, the congregation decided to build a new sanctuary building at 1222 South Guthrie. The first service there was held on September 21, 1969.

References

External links
 Holy Trinity Greek Orthodox Church
  Everett, Dianna. "Holy Trinity Greek Orthodox Church." Encyclopedia of Oklahoma History and Culture  Accessed March 27, 2016.

Further reading
 Costopoulous, Connie and Drummond, Kathryn. History of Holy Trinity Greek Orthodox Church, Tulsa, Oklahoma (Tulsa, Okla.: N.p., 1982). 
 Stephanopoulos, Robert G.  The Greek Orthodox Archdiocese of America (N.p.: Greek Orthodox Archdiocese of America, 1983).

Churches in Tulsa, Oklahoma
European American culture in Oklahoma
Greek Orthodox churches in the United States
Christian organizations established in 1925